The DBAR problem, or the -problem, is the problem of solving the differential equation

The operator  is called the DBAR operator

The DBAR operator is nothing other than the complex conjugate of the operator

denoting the usual differentiation in the complex -plane.

The DBAR problem is of key importance in the theory of integrable systems and generalizes the Riemann–Hilbert problem.

References

DBAR problem